South Kingstown is a town in, and the county seat of, Washington County, Rhode Island, United States. The population was 31,931 at the 2020 census. South Kingstown is the second largest town in Rhode Island by total geographic area, behind New Shoreham, and the third largest town in Rhode Island by geographic land area, behind Exeter and Coventry.

History
The Narragansett Indians were known to occupy a winter camp in the Great Swamp, within present day South Kingstown. 

In March of 1638, Rhode Island founder Roger Williams signed an agreement with two Sachems of the Narragansett Tribe, Canonicus and Miantonomoh, establishing the boundaries between the Narragansett Tribe and the Colony of Rhode Island, as well as to purchase Aquidneck Island. The agreement was signed at Pettaquamscutt Rock, which is now a part of South Kingstown. Twenty years later, on January 20, 1658, Roger Williams again met with the Sachems of the Narragansett Tribe to purchase much of the area that is now present-day Washington County, including South Kingstown, in what is now known as the Pettaquamscutt Purchase of 1658. This agreement was also signed at Pettaquamscutt Rock.

South Kingstown was sparsely populated and mostly inhabited by farmers in the late seventeenth and early eighteenth century, due to the high demand for livestock and produce in Newport, and land speculators who wanted to hold the land to resell when more settlers inevitably came into the area. Widespread population of the land was discouraged due to a speculation company known as the Atherton Syndicate buying up land to resell, the powerful Narragansett Nation discouraging settlements, and a dispute over the land with neighboring Connecticut. Over time, most of these problems slowly went away with time. In the late 1660s, the Atherton Syndicate was run off to join Connecticut in its dispute over the territory and eventually going bankrupt. In 1675 the Great Swamp Fight, a battle of King Philip's War fought by the New England Confederation, essentially wiped out the Narragansett. However in retaliation the Narragansett razed most of the settlements in South Kingstown, including Little Rest, the largest. After the destruction of Little Rest, the land was described as a "desolate wilderness". Finally, in 1723, Connecticut conceded that the territory belonged to Rhode Island, after decades of lobbying before the Court of St James's in London. In the same year, the Rhode Island General Assembly split the town of Kingstown into the towns of North Kingstown and South Kingstown. The towns were formally incorporated on February 25, 1723.

In 1888 a narrow strip of land running along the eastern bank of the Pettaquamscutt River to the shore of Narragansett Bay was separated from South Kingstown to form the town of Narragansett.

Geography
According to the United States Census Bureau, the town has a total area of 79.8 square miles (206.6 km²), of which, 57.1 square miles (147.9 km2) of it is land and 22.7 square miles (58.7 km2) of it (28.43%) is water.

South Kingstown includes the villages of Kingston, West Kingston, Wakefield, Peace Dale, Usquepaug, Snug Harbor, Tuckertown, East Matunuck, Matunuck, Green Hill, and Perryville.  Peace Dale and Wakefield are treated as a census-designated place called Wakefield-Peacedale. Ocean Ridge, Indian Lake, Curtis Corner, and Torrey Hill are among the other small areas that are regarded as unique localities, although official distinctions are less clear. Middlebridge, located on the west side of Narrow River, is a densely populated neighborhood in the town.

Climate
According to the Köppen climate classification, South Kingstown has either a hot-summer humid continental climate (abbreviated Dfa), or a hot-summer humid sub-tropical climate (abbreviated Cfa), depending on the isotherm used.

Adjacent towns

 Charlestown, Rhode Island – Southwest
 Exeter, Rhode Island – Northwest
 Narragansett, Rhode Island – East
 North Kingstown, Rhode Island – Northeast
 Richmond, Rhode Island – Northwest

South Kingstown is bordered on the south by Block Island Sound.

Demographics

As of the census of 2000, there were 27,921 people, 9,268 households, and 6,394 families residing in the town. The racial makeup of the town was 91.11% White, 1.57% African American, 1.61% Native American, 3.08% Asian, 0.05% Pacific Islander, 0.73% from other races, and 1.86% from two or more races. Hispanic or Latino of any race were 1.77% of the population.

There were 9,268 households, out of which 34.0% had children under the age of 18 living with them, 56.4% were married couples living together, 9.4% had a female householder with no husband present, and 31.0% were non-families. 24.2% of all households were made up of individuals, and 9.6% had someone living alone who was 65 years of age or older.  The average household size was 2.56 and the average family size was 3.07.

In the town the population was spread out, with 22.5% under the age of 18, 19.8% from 18 to 24, 24.4% from 25 to 44, 21.7% from 45 to 64, and 11.6% who were 65 years of age or older.  The median age was 34 years. For every 100 females, there were 90.5 males.  For every 100 females age 18 and over, there were 87.5 males.

The median income for a household in the town was $56,325, and the median income for a family was $67,912. Males had a median income of $50,519 versus $31,087 for females. The per capita income for the town was $23,827.  About 3.1% of families and 5.3% of the population were below the poverty line, including 4.9% of those under age 18 and 5.0% of those age 65 or over.

Arts and culture
Art galleries include the Hera Gallery (Wakefield), South County Art Association (Kingston), and sometimes the Courthouse Center for the Arts (or CCA, West Kingston). Theaters include The Contemporary Theater Company (Wakefield), the Theatre-by-the-Sea (Matunuck), and the CCA. The sole cinema is South County Cinema 8 (Wakefield), which replaced the independently run Campus Cinema (Wakefield) in the early 2000s. There are numerous venues for music and other entertainment, including the University of Rhode Island's Ryan Center and smaller venues such as Lily Pads (Peace Dale), and the CCA.

Arts and cultural education is also offered through community centers like The Guild and the Senior Center in Wakefield. There are also three public libraries which are located in Kingston, Matunuck, and Peace Dale.

Museums
The South County History Center, located in the village of Kingston, is located in a former jail building and contains a collection of fine Early American artifacts.  The Peace Dale Museum of Art and Culture in the village of Peace Dale in South Kingstown holds in its collections artifacts of the local Narragansett People and from indigenous cultures around the world.

Points of interest
South Kingstown is the location of the deadly Great Swamp Fight that occurred during King Philip's War in 1675. The battle site is commemorated by a rough granite shaft about twenty feet high. Around the mound on which the shaft stands are four granite markers engraved with the names of the colonies which took part in the battle.
South Kingstown is home to 31 sites listed on the National Register of Historic Places, 4 of which are historic districts. A driving tour is described by the Pettaquamscutt Historical Society.

 Kingston Village Historic District, located in the village of Kingston
 Peace Dale Historic District, located in the village of Peace Dale
 Usquepaug Road Historic District, located near the village of Usquepaug
 Wakefield Historic District, located in the village of Wakefield
 Hannah Robinson Tower, located on McSparran Hill

Sports
The Ocean State Waves of the New England Collegiate Baseball League play their home games at Old Mountain Field.

Parks and recreation

South Kingstown has over ten miles of undisturbed beaches. South Kingstown has also recently made an upgrade to their town's parks and recreation by building the South Kingstown Recreation Center located at 30 St. Dominic Rd.

Government
All 5 seats on the town council are at-large seats that are up for election every 2 years, with no term limits. After each election, the newly elected council members elect two of their own as president and vice president. The current president is Rory McEntee, and the current vice president is Michael Marran.

Representation in state legislature 
South Kingstown is represented in the Rhode Island House of Representatives by Carol McEntee (D), Teresa Tanzi (D), Blake Filippi (R) and Kathleen Fogarty (D). The town is represented in the Rhode Island Senate by Bridget Valverde (D), Susan Sosnowski (D), and Dennis Algiere (R).

Education
South Kingstown is served by the South Kingstown School District. The district includes nine schools that serve students in grades prekindergarten to twelfth.

Pre-kindergarten (Pre-K)
 South Kingstown Inclusionary Pre-School, located in the village of Wakefield

Elementary schools
 Matunuck Elementary School, located in the village of Matunuck
 Peace Dale Elementary School, located in the village of Peace Dale
 West Kingston Elementary School, located in the village of West Kingston
 Kingston Hill Academy, a public charter school located in the village of Kingston   
The Compass School, a public charter school located in the village of Kingston

Middle schools
 Broad Rock Middle School, located in the village of Wakefield
 Curtis Corner Middle School, located in the village of Wakefield

High schools
 Independence Transition Academy, located in the village of Kingston
 South Kingstown High School, located in the village of Wakefield

Colleges and universities
The University of Rhode Island is located in the village of Kingston.

Private schools
 The Compass School, a public charter school located in the village of Kingston
 Monsignor Clarke School, a K-8 Catholic school located in the village of Wakefield
 The Prout School, a Catholic high school located in the village of Wakefield

Infrastructure

Emergency services
Law enforcement is maintained by the South Kingstown Police Department, located in the village of Peace Dale. The Rhode Island State Police Wickford Barracks, located in the Town of North Kingstown, has jurisdiction.

South Kingstown fire protection is provided by the Union Fire District of South Kingstown, a volunteer department.

South County Hospital is located in the village of Wakefield.

Transportation

Roads
Roads in South Kingstown included U.S. Route 1, Route 1A, Route 2, Route 108, Route 110, and Route 138.

Rail
Rail service is provided by Amtrak via Kingston Station, which is located in the village of West Kingston. Kingston is a stop along Amtrak's Northeast Corridor and is serviced by their Northeast Regional train service.  The Northeast Regional has a northern terminus with Boston's South Station with a major stop en route in Providence, and has a southern terminus with Washington's Union Station with major stops en route in New Haven, New York City, Philadelphia, Wilmington, and Baltimore.

Public transportation
Public transportation in South Kingstown is provided by the statewide Rhode Island Public Transit Authority or RIPTA.  The following routes service South Kingstown:

 64 Newport / URI – Link
 65X Wakefield Express – Link
 66 URI / Galilee – Link

Utilities

Electricity
Electricity services are provided by Rhode Island Energy.

Telephone
Local and long distance landline telephone services are provided by Verizon New England.

Notable people

References

External links

 Town of South Kingstown, Rhode Island

South Kingstown, Rhode Island
Towns in Washington County, Rhode Island
County seats in Rhode Island
Populated coastal places in Rhode Island
Providence metropolitan area
Towns in Rhode Island
Populated places established in 1722
1722 establishments in the Thirteen Colonies